Litlekalsøy is an island in Austevoll municipality in Vestland county, Norway.  The  island lies in the Austevoll archipelago.  It sits in the Møkstrafjorden south of the island of Møkster, north of the island of Stolmen, and west of the large island of Huftarøy.  The island had 26 inhabitants in 2001.  The island is only accessible by boat.

See also
List of islands of Norway

References

Islands of Vestland
Austevoll